A rib vault or ribbed vault is an architectural feature for covering a wide space, such as a church nave, composed of a framework of crossed or diagonal arched ribs. Variations were used in Roman architecture, Byzantine architecture, Islamic architecture, Romanesque architecture, and especially Gothic architecture. Thin stone panels fill the space between the ribs. This greatly reduced the weight and thus the outward thrust of the vault. The ribs transmit the load downward and outward to specific points, usually rows of columns or piers. This feature allowed architects of Gothic cathedrals to make higher and thinner walls and much larger windows.

It is a type of arcuated, or arched, vault in which the severies, or panels in the bays of the vault's underside are separated from one another by ribs which conceal the groins, or the intersections of the panels. Rib vaults are, like groin vaults, formed from two or three intersecting barrel vaults; the ribs conceal the junction of the vaults.

The earliest surviving example in Islamic architecture is at the Mosque–Cathedral of Córdoba in al-Andalus, which predates the earliest Romanesque examples by a century. An alternative to barrel vaults in the naves of churches, rib vaults in 12th century early Gothic architecture began to be used in vaults made with pointed arches, already known in the Romanesque style. In these vaults, as in groin vaults, the weight was directed it to the corners, where piers, columns, or walls could support it. Walls in Gothic buildings were often abutted by flying buttresses. These elements made it possible to construct buildings with much higher and thinner walls than before, with immense bays, and larger stained glass windows filling the structure with light.

Cross vaults are constructed of narrow, arched ribs that diagonally cross the area to be covered. The severies can be filled with small pieces of masonry, eliminating much of the massive weight of barrel vaults. These rib vaults could also more efficiently cover large rectangular areas. Thanks to the pointed arch employed in Gothic architecture, builders could raise or lower the arches so they would have the same height for a short span or a long span, something not possible with round arches. Pointed arches also made two intersecting vaults of the same height but different widths easier to construct.

Early history

The Romans used an early version of the rib vault to strengthen groin vaults. In these Roman vaults, the brick ribs were embedded into the concrete of the vault. This was different from the later Gothic vaults, where the ribs were separate from the infilling of the panels, which gave the Gothic vaults flexibility and thus greater strength. The Romans also used these embedded ribs concealed within the structure to strengthen the concrete surface of domes, such as the Pantheon.

Rib vaults were not common in masonry buildings in Byzantine architecture, but four ribbed vaults were built by the Hosios Loukas monastery in Byzantine Greece after 1000 AD, and at the now ruined town Çanlı Kilise in Byzantine Cappadocia several groin vaults in medieval churches are equipped with ribs. A number of other rib vaults were built in Greece under the Frankokratia after the Fourth Crusade. Rib vaults were also known in Lombard, Armenian, Persian, and Islamic architecture.

Cross vaults

Islamic architecture 
In the Moorish architecture of Spain, Islamic architects used these ribbed vaults more visibly. One notable example is found in the Great Mosque of Córdoba, which was begun in the 9th century and extended between 922 and 965 by Al-Hakam II. The Chapel of Villaviciosa, as this part of the mosque became known when it was converted to a Roman Catholic church in the 13th century, has a dome which rests upon ribs and pendentives. At each vertex of the square is the intersection with another arch, such that each intersection is the junction of three arches. At each corner is a further miniature cross-vault dome. In the other domes of the 10th century reconstruction of the Great Mosque, the ribs intersect one another off-centre, forming an eight-pointed star in the centre which is topped by a pendentive dome.

The crossed-arch vaults of the mosque-cathedral of Córdoba served as models for later mosque buildings in the Islamic West, including al-Andalus and the Maghreb. At around 1000 AD, the Mezquita de Bab al Mardum (Mosque of Cristo de la Luz) in Toledo was constructed with a similar, eight-ribbed vault. The dome is supported both by the ribs and by pendentives that transmit its weight to the walls below. Similar vaults are also seen in the mosque building of the Aljafería of Zaragoza. The architectural form of the ribbed vault was further developed in the Maghreb: the central dome of the Great Mosque of Tlemcen, a work of the Almoravids built in 1082, has twelve slender ribs, the shell between the ribs is filled with filigree stucco work.

Romanesque architecture 
The rib vault was developed further in northern Europe in the 11th century, as builders sought a way to construct larger and larger stone vaults to replace the wooden roofs of Romanesque churches, which were frequently destroyed by fire. Romanesque cathedrals and churches usually used the barrel vault, with rounded arches, and the groin vault, used when two vaults met at a right angle to cover the nave. The weight of the vaults pressed down directly onto the walls below, requiring thicker walls and smaller windows.

Saint-Philibert de Tournus has exceptional Romanesque vaults, built between 1008 and 1050. The nave and chapel have parallel traverse tunnel vaults, while the aisles of both interiors are groin-vaulted.

Speyer Cathedral in Germany is the largest of all existing Romanesque churches in Europe, and has good examples of Romanesque barrel vaults and groin vaults in the nave. The groin vaults were built in 1060, and but had to be reinforced in 1090–1103 with a traverse arch between each arch.

The Kingdom of England and the Duchy of Normandy became centres of architectural innovation in the late 11th century. Even before the Norman Conquest in 1066, King Edward the Confessor of England had introduced Romanesque features to Westminster Abbey (1055–65). William the Conqueror constructed the domes of the Abbey of Saint-Étienne, Caen with a kind of crossed rib vault, a star vault, in its central lantern. The Abbaye-aux-Dames also in Caen, was roofed with two large bays of stone groin vaults in the 1080s, one of the earliest uses in Europe of a groin vault to cover such a wide span.

Transition to Gothic architecture 
Construction of the new church at Durham Cathedral began in 1093 under the direction of its Norman bishop, William de St-Calais. It was originally intended to build the cathedral entirely with rounded-arch groin vaults, but as work continued on the nave the Norman builders experimented with pointed arches, which directed the weight outward and downwards. The space between the ribs was filled with severies made of small pieces of stone. At its corners the weight was supported by colonettes which transferred it downwards to alternating columns and piers below rather than to the walls. Since the panels are relatively thin, these rib vaults are lighter than the earlier barrel and groin vaults so the walls could be higher and could have larger windows.

The work began at the east end of Durham Cathedral; the vaults over the aisles were complete in 1096, and over the choir by 1107. The nave vaults, with pointed arches, were begun in about 1130. Thanks to the pointed arches, the upper level of the clerestory seemed to merge into the roof in a unified whole. The Durham experiment, however, quickly ran into problems. The vault panels in the chancel were made of plastered rubble, and were heavier than expected, and began to crack, and had to be replaced in 1235. In the meanwhile, experimentation in pointed rib vaults moved to France, where thinner and lighter panels were made of small cut pieces of stone, rather than rubble.

The Romanesque Lessay Abbey in Normandy added early Gothic rib vaults in the choir in about 1098. which covered portions of the choir and nave. It was destroyed in World War II but rebuilt. The dome of the Romanesque Church of the Holy Sepulchre, Cambridge in England, begun in 1130, has ribs in the dome, though the dome rests upon pendentives, and the ribs were largely decorative. The Romanesque Cefalù Cathedral in the Norman Kingdom of Sicily, begun in 1148–1240, has a Romanesque rib vault.

The transition from Romanesque to Gothic can also be seen in the nave of Fontenay Abbey church (1147), where the round arches of the barrel vaults have been replaced by vaults with slightly pointed arches.

Other variations of rib vaults, usually with rounded arches, appeared in Lombardy in the Basilica of Sant'Ambrogio, Milan, at the end of the 11th century, and in Southwest France at Moissac Abbey (11th-12th century). These were usually groin vaults, composed by joining two barrel vaults at right angles. Other types of vaults were decorative, such as the star vaults used to decorate the lantern tower on the roof of Caen Cathedral and Laon Cathedral, or the ribs on the interior of the dome of the Round Church in Cambridge (1130).

Sexpartite vaulting 

In sexpartite vaulting, each bay was divided by thin stone ribs into six compartments. The intermediate ribs diagonally crossing the vault formed a pointed arch, and there was an additional intermediate pointed arch, which crossed from side to side. Since the ribs carried the weight, the panels of the vaults were made of small pieces of stone, and were much lighter than traditional barrel vaults. The ribs transmitted the weight outwards and downwards through slender columns to the piers on the lower level. The weight was not distributed equally; the additional weight of the diagonal traverse arches was supported by massive piers, while the intermediate crossing arch was supported by simple columns. Since the weight of the vaults was carried by the columns and piers, not the walls, the walls could be thinner and higher, and they could be filled with larger stained glass windows.

The sexpartite vault appeared almost simultaneously in England and France. The first cathedral to use sexpartite vaults was Durham Cathedral, begun in 1093. Durham was originally intended to be built with more traditional groin vaults. The vaults over the aisles were completed in 1096, those over the choir in 1107, these over the north transept and 1110. The traverse vaults of the nave, however, the arches over the south transept and nave, begun 1130, were given pointed arches. Early examples of sexpartite rib vaults are found at the Abbaye-aux-Hommes (begun 1066) and Abbaye-aux-Dames at Caen. It then appeared in Noyon Cathedral (begun 1131); the square Gothic porch of the Romanesque church of Vézelay Abbey in France (1132); Sens Cathedral (begun 1135); the choir of the Abbey of Saint-Denis (begun 1140); Notre-Dame de Paris (begun 1163); Bourges Cathedral; and Laon Cathedral. Ribbed vaults were built by William the Englishman at Canterbury Cathedral and in St Faith's Chapel in Westminster Abbey (1180).

Quadripartite vaulting 
A new variation of rib vault appeared during the High Gothic: the four-part rib vault, which was used in Chartres Cathedral, Amiens Cathedral and Reims Cathedral. The ribs of this vault distributed the weight more equally to the four supporting piers below, and established a closer connection between the nave and the lower portions of the church walls, and between the arcades below and the windows above. This allowed for greater height and thinner walls, and contributed to the strong impression of verticality given by the newer Cathedrals. The 12th-century nave of Notre-Dame de Paris, also with six-part rib vaults, is 115 feet, or 35 meters high. The tallest nave of all the Gothic Cathedrals is Beauvais Cathedral, though only a single bay was completed.

Complex rib vaults

Beginning in England with the Decorated Gothic style of the late 13th century, a variety of complex vaults emerged which incorporated purely decorative ribs in addition to structural ones. Vaults would continue to increase in complexity in the Perpendicular period, and similarly extravagant rib vaulting would appear in other late Gothic styles such as the Flamboyant in France and Sondergotik in Central Europe.

Tierceron vaults make use of tertiary ribs (tiercerons) in addition to the main structural ribs of the regular quadripartite vault. This can be seen in the Decorated Gothic nave of Exeter Cathedral, begun in 1310; the massive vault has a profusion of tierceron ribs like palm leaves, with as many as eleven tiercerons curving upward from a single springer. An octagonal tierceron vault completed in 1306 roofs the chapter house of Wells Cathedral, where 32 ribs spring from a single central pillar. At Ely Cathedral (1322–1342), tiercerons decorate the (wooden) vault of the octagonal lantern over the crossing.

Lierne vaults also feature prominently in the Decorated and Perpendicular Gothic architecture of England. Liernes are very short decorative ribs that connect one rib to another. Most lierne vaults incorporate both liernes and tiercerons, resulting in intricate designs resembling stars, webs, nets, or other patterns. The Perpendicular Gothic choir of Gloucester Cathedral features an extremely complex net-like vault covered completely in liernes, while the Lady Chapel of Ely Cathedral has a vault of liernes concentrated mainly around the centreline of the ceiling.

The Perpendicular Gothic fan vault is a unique type of rib vault particular to England. The ribs are all of the same curve and spaced equidistantly, in a manner resembling a fan. Thus, unlike gothic vaults derived from pointed arches, the fan vault is composed of semicircular conoids. The earliest example of fan vaulting is in the cloisters of Gloucester Cathedral. The King's College Chapel, Cambridge, has the world's largest fan-vaulted ceiling.

Function

The development of the rib vault was the result of the search for greater height and more light in the naves of cathedrals. In Romanesque cathedrals, the nave was typically covered by a series of groin vaults, which were formed by the intersection of two barrel vaults. The vaults pressed down directly onto the walls. The groin vaults were bombée, or roughly dome-shaped. To support the weight of the vaults, the walls had to be particularly thick, and windows were absent or very small. This problem was resolved in the early 11th century by the introduction of the Gothic rib vault.

Rib vaults are reinforced by a network of thin stone ribs. In the first six-part vaults, the vault was supported by two diagonal crossing ribs, plus an intermediate rib, which together divided the vault into six sections. The diagonal ribs were in the form of semicircular arches, which raised the centre of the vault above the level of the transverse arches and wall ribs, and gave it the appearance of a small dome. (This kind of vault can be seen in the nave of Sant' Ambrogio, Milan). In some new churches, the architects dealt with the problem by raising the upper part of their arches was raised. This was tried in some of the earliest Gothic churches, notably the Abbaye-aux-Hommes and the Abbey of Lessay in Normandy.

The problem was ultimately solved by the introduction of the pointed arch for the transverse and dividing ribs of the vault. The pointed arch had long been known and employed, on account of its much greater strength and of the lessened thrust it exerted on the walls. When employed for the ribs of a vault, however narrow or wide the span might be, by adopting a pointed arch, its summit could be made to match the height of the diagonal ribs. The ribs carried the weight of the vault outwards and downwards. The ribs were bundled into columns, each combining four ribs, which descended the walls to the arcades on piers on the ground floor. Outside, the walls were given greater strength by the addition of heavy stone buttresses. The strength of rib vaults made it possible to have thinner walls, which in turn made it possible to have larger windows on the upper levels, filling the nave with light. They eventually made possible the enormous rose windows of Gothic cathedrals.

This six-part vault was successfully introduced in Noyon Cathedral, Laon Cathedral, and Notre-Dame de Paris. A single six-part vault could cover two traverse sections of the nave of Notre-Dame. However, the six-rib vault had its problems. The weight was not distributed evenly to the columns on the ground floor. When a vault covered two traverses, more massive piers were needed to bear the weight from the doubleaux, the diagonal ribs, than for the intermediate ribs. This problem was solved by simplifying the vault and eliminating the intermediate rib, making a four-part or quadripartite rib vault. Under this system, which was promptly used at Amiens Cathedral, Reims Cathedral and many others, each traverse section had just one four-part vault. This innovation, along with the use of the flying buttress, saw Gothic cathedral walls go higher and higher, with larger and larger windows.

The simplification of the rib vault was soon followed, particularly in England, by another tendency – to make them more complicated. One of the earliest examples of the introduction of the intermediate ridge rib is found in the nave of Lincoln Cathedral; This element, called a ridge rib, was not connected to the walls. Architects in England began adding new ribs, largely for decoration. In the nave of Exeter Cathedral three intermediate ribs were provided between the wall rib and the diagonal rib. In order to mask the junction of the various ribs, their intersections were ornamented with richly carved bosses, and this practice increased with the introduction of another short rib, known as lierne vaulting. The lierne, a term in France given to the ridge rib, in English refers to short ribs that cross between the main ones; these were employed chiefly as decorative features, for example in stellar vaults, one of the best examples of which is in the vault of the oriel window of Crosby Hall, London. Ribs came more and more numerous and more and more decorative leading to the extraordinarily elaborate and decorative fan vault, first used in the choir of Gloucester Cathedral.

Construction

The first step in the construction of a vault was a wooden scaffold up to the level of the top of the supporting columns. Next, a precise wooden frame was constructed on top of the scaffold in the exact shape of the ribs. The stone segments of the ribs were then carefully laid into the frame and joined with mortar. When the ribs were all in place, the keystone was placed at the apex where they converged. Once the keystone was in place, the ribs could stand alone, supported by their weight pressing downwards and outwards. Workers then filled in the compartments between the ribs with small fitted pieces of brick or stone. The framework was removed. The masonry of the compartments was about 15 cm thick. Once the compartments were finished, their interior surface was plastered and then painted.

The construction of a medieval rib vault was a complex operation involving a team of specialized workers. These craftsmen worked alongside carpenters who built the complex scaffolds and models.

See also
 Gothic architecture
 Gothic cathedrals and churches
 List of architectural vaults

Notes and citations

Bibliography

 

 
 
 
 
 
 Texier, Simon, (2012), Paris Panorama de l'architecture de l'Antiquité à nos jours, Parigramme, Paris (in French), 
 
 Wenzler, Claude (2018), Cathédales Gothiques – un Défi Médiéval, Éditions Ouest-France, Rennes (in French) 

Arches and vaults
Arab inventions
Spanish inventions